"Keep Your Head to the Sky" is a song recorded by American R&B band Earth, Wind & Fire for their 1973 album, Head to the Sky. It was released as a single by Columbia Records, peaking at No. 23 on the Billboard Hot Soul Singles chart.

Overview
"Keep Your Head to the Sky" was written by Maurice White and produced by Joe Wissert. The single's b-side was a tune called "Build Your Nest". Both songs came from Earth, Wind & Fire's 1973 studio album Head to the Sky.

Critical reception
Vince Aletti of Rolling Stone proclaimed that Keep Your Head to the Sky "with the gentle admonition to keep your head in faith’s atmosphere, has a luscious, luminous quality". Alex Henderson of Allmusic also called the tune "hauntingly pretty".

Personnel 

 Philip Bailey - lead and backing vocals
 Verdine White - backing vocals, bass
 Johnny Graham - guitar
 Maurice White - backing vocals, drums
 Larry Dunn - Fender Rhodes
 Al McKay - sitar
 Jessica Cleaves - backing vocals

Samples
"Keep Your Head to the Sky" was sampled by Jay Z on his 1994 track "Reach the Top" and by Guru featuring Amel Larrieux on the track "Guidance" from his 2000 album Guru's Jazzmatazz, Vol. 3: Streetsoul. The song was also sampled by Kirk Franklin on the track "Keep Your Head" from his 2005 album Hero and by DMX on the track "Head Up" from his 2012 album Undisputed.

Keep Your Head To The Sky was interpolated by Mary J. Blige on the track Keep Your Head from her 1998 live album The Tour.

The song's titular lyric is alluded to in Raphael Saadiq's 2008 song "Sometimes", from The Way I See It.

Chart positions

References

1973 singles
Earth, Wind & Fire songs
Songs written by Maurice White
1973 songs
Columbia Records singles